Torneo Sangre Nueva ("The New Blood Tournament") is a professional wrestling tournament promoted by the Mexican lucha libre promotion Consejo Mundial de Lucha Libre (CMLL), first held in 2012. The tournament focuses primarily on younger wrestlers or wrestlers who work in the lower ranks of the promotion, generally the first or second match of the show, as a way to highlight or promote a wrestler up to a higher level of competition. A total of 27 individuals have competed in the two Sangre Nueva tournaments held as of 2014 with nine competitors participating in both tournaments held so far: Bobby Zavala, Camaleón, El Cholo, Disturbio, Hombre Bala Jr., Robin, Soberano Jr., Stigma and Super Halcón Jr. Soberano Jr. is both the youngest competitor over-all (18 years and 206 days old) and the youngest tournament winner as well (19 days and 198 days old), while Cholo is the oldest (40 years and 56 days) at the time of his second tournament participation.

Sangre Nueva tournament winners

Torneo Sangre Nueva 2012

The first ever Torneo Sangre Nueva took place in March 2012. Some of the competitors did not fit the "New Blood" tournaments, but in the case of wrestlers like Cancerbero and Raziel, the ring persona he portrayed had only been used for around 2 years, making the character a rookie, but not the man under the mask. CMLL has a history of not openly promoting the fact that some of their workers have worked under different identities previously. The tournament played out from March 6, 2012, until March 20, 2012, on CMLL's Tuesday shows in Arena Mexico. The first two shows had 8 wrestlers compete for a shot at the finals. Each night the eight wrestlers competed in a "Seeding" battle royal to determine the four on four Torneo cibernetico elimination match. On the first night El Cholo, Soberano Jr., Cancerbero, and Dragon Lee comprised one team while Bobby Zavala, Titán, Stigma and Camaleón on the other. Dragon Lee won the match, lastly eliminating Titán to win the match. The second block, on March 13, 2012 saw Disturbio, Hombre Bala Jr., Raziel, and Tritón team up to face Robin, Bronco, Hijo del Signo, and Super Halcón Jr. Raziel took the victory, eliminating Tritón to end the nearly 25 minute long match to move on to the finals. A week later, on March 20, 2012 Dragon Lee and Raziel faced off in the only three fall match of the night. Dragon Lee defeated Raziel to win the Torneo Sangre Nueva.

Cibernetico order of elimination

Aftermath
On June 20, 2012, CMLL held a press conference, during which lucha libre priest Fray Tormenta announced that since Dragon Lee had impressed him with his in-ring performance, Fray Tormenta wanted Dragon Lee to take over the role of Místico, his storyline protégé. Lee immediately accepted Tormenta's offer and received his new mask to officially become the second incarnation of Místico, taking over the highly successful role following the character's original performer, who had signed with WWE in January 2011. Titán entered CMLL's En Busca de un Ídolo ("In search of an Idol") a few months after narrowly missing out on the Sangre Nueva tournament finals. The tournament used a point system that allowed fans to vote online, allowing Titán to advance to the second round despite only winning one of his four first round matches. The fan support propelled Titán to the finale where he defeated Euforia to win the tournament. Titán would later defeat En Busca de un Ídolo rival Pólvora to win the Mexican National Welterweight Championship Cholo, Bobby Zavala, Soberano Jr., Camaleón, Stigma, Robin, Disturbio and Super Halcón Jr. would all compete in the subsequent Torneo Sangre Nueva in 2013.

Torneo Sangre Nueva 2013

On February 21, 2013, CMLL announced that they were holding another Torneo Sangre Nueva tournament in 2013, possibly making it an annual event. Like the first tournament the 2013 Sangre Nueva would feature two qualifying torneo cibernetico elimination matches with the winner of each facing off in a one-on-one match. In 2013 the cibernetico match included 10 competitors instead of the eight competitors in the previous year's tournament. The first match took place on February 26, 2013, in Arena Mexico and saw Soberano Jr. (son of CMLL wrestler Euforia) outlast Camaleón, Stigma, Höruz, Hombre Bala Jr., Akuma, Espanto Jr., Herodes Jr., Cholo and Bobby Zavala to qualify for the finals. During the match Höruz suffered a knee injury as a result of a dive out of the ring, the injury was believed to keep him out of the ring for three months. Block B competed on March 5, 2013, for the other finalist spot, with a field that included Genesis, Oro Jr., Robin, Sensei, Super Halcón Jr., Disturbio, Guerrero Negro Jr., Inquisidor, Taurus and Zayco. As with the 2012 Torneo Sangre Nueva, not everyone competing in the tournament fit the "new blood" description; Sensei had worked for CMLL under that ring persona since 2005 and been a professional wrestler even longer. Inquisidor made his professional wrestling in 1995, but only adopted the Inquisidor name and mask in 2008, with CMLL officially not acknowledging his past before becoming Inquisidor. The second Cibernetico was won by Taurus, son of Último Guerrero when he was the last wrestler in the ring, eliminating Guerrero Negro Jr. to earn his spot in the finals for the following week. The following week, Sobereano Jr. defeated Taurus, two falls to one to win the 2013 Sangre Nueva tournament.

Cibernetico order of elimination

Sangre Nueva Tournament Participants

References

2012 in professional wrestling
2013 in professional wrestling
Lucha libre
Consejo Mundial de Lucha Libre tournaments
Events in Mexico City
Recurring events established in 2012